Victorian Trades Hall is the headquarters of the Victorian Trades Hall Council. It is located on the corner of Lygon Street and Victoria Street, just north of the Melbourne central business district, in the suburb of Carlton, Melbourne, Victoria, Australia. It is the world's oldest trade union building.

History 
In 1856 the Melbourne Trades Hall Committee was formed and received a grant of land from premier John O'Shanassy to build the Melbourne Trades Hall. The original Trades Hall was opened in May 1859, built by workers as an organising place for the labour movement in Melbourne, and as a medium to educate workers and their families. The workers financed the construction of the building themselves. It was built in the style of the parliament buildings which were just down the road, and over the years has been further developed. The original building was made of timber with galvanised iron roofing. 

Between 1874 and 1925, the Hall was rebuilt and upgraded by Joseph Reed, the architect responsible for Melbourne icons like the Melbourne Town Hall and the State Library of Victoria. With increasing activity during the 1880s in the Australian labour movement, the committee became a Council to reflect its expanding role, though the full title, Victorian Trades Hall Council was only formally adopted in 1968. The building remains one of the most historically important sites in Melbourne today, being classified by the National Trust and included in the Register of Historic Buildings (Victoria).

The Trades Hall is located across the road from the eight-hour day monument which was erected to honour the Victorian workers who won the first 8-hour working day in the world in 1856. It is the birthplace of organisations like the Victorian Labor Party and the Australian Council of Trade Unions. Four flags fly from the roof of the building: the Australian Flag, the Eureka Flag, the Australian Aboriginal flag, and the red flag.

Trades Hall is home to a number of Victorian trade unions, community organisations and left-wing political parties. Until 2017, it had also served as the headquarters of the National Union of Students. The Hall is primarily used by Victorian labour organisations as a space for organising and coordinating campaigns. The Hall also hosts occupational health and safety training for workers. The various rooms of the Hall can also be hired out for functions, meetings or conferences and it is often used for theatrical productions and to display artwork. The Hall has a bar which is patronised by trade union members and political activists and a bookshop which sells political texts. In 1931, the hall was used as a broadcast venue for 3KZ, the predecessor station to Gold 104.3.

In recent times, as well as serving as the headquarters of various trade unions and being the centre for political and union activities, the Trades Hall Council has opened the Trades Hall building to many cultural events such as theatre productions, art exhibitions, plays, and concerts including the Melbourne Comedy Festival–concentrating on political and 'on the edge' performances.

References

Further sources
 Melbourne Trades Hall Memories Marcella Pearce (1997) Victorian Trades Hall Council

External links

 Victorian Trades Hall Council
 Trades Hall & Literary Institute
 New International Bookshop
 8 Hour Day: The battle for civilised working hours

Trade unions in Victoria (Australia)
Heritage-listed buildings in Melbourne
Buildings and structures in the City of Melbourne (LGA)
Office buildings completed in 1859
Neoclassical architecture in Australia
Music venues in Melbourne
Trades halls in Australia
1859 establishments in Australia
Landmarks in Melbourne
Theatres in Melbourne